DIALOG (formerly Cohos Evamy) is a Canadian architectural, engineering, interior design and planning firm.  It operates as a single company, with studios in Vancouver, Calgary, Edmonton, Toronto, San Francisco and Oakland.

History
Cohos Evamy was founded as an architecture and engineering studio in Calgary, Alberta, Canada in 1960, and quickly evolved into an interdisciplinary model under the leadership of Martin Cohos, FRAIC, Michael Evamy, FAIC and Paul Poffenroth, P.Eng. The Cohos Evamy Partners opened the Edmonton office in the 1980s.

In 2003, Cohos Evamy opened a Toronto, Ontario studio.  Together, the three studios in Calgary, Edmonton and Toronto serve Canada from the West coast to the East coast. In 2010, Cohos Evamy merged with Vancouver-based architectural firm HBBH, among others, and was renamed DIALOG.

Areas of practice
Areas of practice include architecture, programming, urban planning, interior design, graphics, 3D modeling, and structural, mechanical, and electrical engineering. The practice includes designing buildings for retail, commercial office, education, health care institutions, research facilities, airports, retail petroleum stations, and arts and cultural work.

As of 2022, the firm employed more than 700 people.

Portfolio
TransCanada Tower, Calgary, Calgary, Alberta
Western Canadian Place, Calgary, Alberta
Bankers Hall, Calgary, Alberta
Bankers Court, Calgary, Alberta
Calgary International Airport, Calgary, Alberta
Transalta Arts Barns, Edmonton, Alberta
Listowel Memorial Hospital, Listowel, Ontario (Currently under construction)
Francis Winspear Centre for Music, Edmonton, Alberta
Calgary Central Library, Calgary, Alberta

References

External links
DIALOG (website)
Michael Evamy Memorial Scholarship

Architecture firms of Canada
Companies based in Calgary
Design companies established in 1960
1960 establishments in Alberta